Athanasios "Nasos" Ktorides (born 10 November 1968) is a Cypriot entrepreneur and philanthropist, founding Chairman and CEO of the EuroAsia Interconnector electricity cable, Quantum Corporation, Quantum Energy, Quantum Cable and EuroAfrica Interconnector. He is first Cyprus Goodwill Ambassador for UNICEF.

Life and work  
Athanasios "Nasos" Ktorides was born on 10 November 1968 in Nicosia, Cyprus. He studied at the American College of Greece in Athens and attended the Harvard Executive Leadership Programme in 2007 (now Harvard Professional Development Programme).

Ktorides is a firm believer in the motto "if you can dream it then you can achieve it".
From an early age, he manifested his independence in what is achievable. He attempts to take the roads less traveled, without being confined to tried and tested solutions or secure boundaries.

Ktorides's activities extend primarily beyond Cyprus and embrace the sectors of energy and banking. His company Quantum was instrumental in the establishment of the Commercial Bank of Greece in Cyprus, in which it was the second biggest shareholder after the Hellenic Republic. Quantum's Chairman, Mr. Athanasios Ktorides, also acted as the bank's Executive Vice Chairman for a period of 7 years. The partnership created excellent results for the bank's development.

He is also involved in electricity generation with five power plants of installed capacity 1422 MW connected to the Pan-European electric network. He has been actively working towards the strategic upgrade of Cyprus in the international energy arena, the key projects being the EuroAsia Interconnector and EuroAfrica Interconnector, eastern Mediterranean sub-sea electricity cables. The EuroAsia Interconnector will link Israel with Cypriot and Greek power grids with high-voltage direct current submarine power cable of length around  
.
It will have a capacity to transmit 2,000 megawatts of electricity in either direction. EuroAfrica Interconnector will link Egypt with Cypriot and Greek power grids through the island of Crete with high-voltage direct current submarine power cable of length around 1707 km.

Ktorides's business philosophy derives from the values of honesty, integrity, altruism, a systematic approach to work and above all from highlighting the positive, be this related to his colleagues or projects on which he works.

Philanthropy 

Nasos Ktorides also believes that it is necessary to reciprocate the gift of life with love towards our fellow human beings. For this reason in 2008 he formalized his longstanding altruistic activities with the establishment of a not-for-profit, philanthropic fund, the Athanasios Ktorides Foundation. The Foundation grants 10 full scholarships for studies in leading European and American universities for 2018—2019. A recent significant project is the support of the "Heroes Photovoltaic Park", the largest in Cyprus, with 10 MW of power on the land of the University of Cyprus. The Foundation was also the main organizer of the Quantum Nicosia Marathon in 2010  and has made significant
contribution to the arts, most importantly to secure and repatriate historically important documents and other works.
It sponsors charity activities that benefit families, children with special needs,  orphans, children's shelters, and all other activities aimed at the protection and well-being of children.
In 2009, his business scope and humanitarian sensibility was recognized by the Commonwealth of Dominica  as the ideal credentials for the post as Honorary Consul of the country in Cyprus. The Prime Minister of Dominica awarded him the "Dominica Medal of Honor", as well as the diplomatic passport of the country.

Four international personalities, the President of the Republic of Serbia, the Prime Minister of the Commonwealth of Dominica, the President of the Republic of Cyprus Glafkos Clerides  and the Archbishop of Athens and All Greece Ieronymos II of Athens, called upon UNICEF to use the good offices of Nasos Ktorides.
On February 8, 2012, UNICEF declared Nasos Ktorides as National Goodwill Ambassador who, together with author Antonis Samarakis and principal of the Panthéon-Sorbonne University and rector of the Academy of Paris Eleni Glykatzi-Arveler,  completes the trio of personalities of the wider Hellenic world who have enjoyed such recognition to date.

Albert Camus' letter  

Marking the 50th anniversary of the execution of Michalis Karaolis on May 10, 1956, a handwritten manuscript by the philhellene Nobel laureate and philosopher, Albert Camus, appealing to Queen Elizabeth II for mercy for the young Greek Cypriot freedom fighter of the 1955-59 EOKA struggle for independence, was  acquired  from auction by Nasos Ktorides and donated to the National Struggle Museum in Nicosia. In a letter of appreciation in June 2006, President Tassos Papadopoulos praised the benefactor.

Karaolis, just 22 years old at the time, was credited with the execution on August 28, 1955, of a police officer, member of the Special Branch who had infiltrated the EOKA movement. On his way to rejoin the guerrillas headed by Grigoris Afxentiou in the Kyrenia mountains, Karaolis was captured and sentenced to death on October 28.
He was hanged at the Central Prisons on May 10, 1956, together with Andreas Dimitriou, the first heroes of the independence struggle. Their bodies are buried at the memorial graveyard within the prisons and visited by thousands each year, during national holidays.

Marathon  and sport

An active sportsman who believes that a "a healthy body builds a healthy mind", Nasos has participated in marathon events since 2008, participating among others in the Athens and Boston Marathons,

as well as in the North Pole and Antarctic Ice Marathon, while setting his sights to one day run in the Everest Marathon. North Pole Marathon is recognized as the northernmost marathon on earth and until now only several hundred people participated. Nasos Ktorides had honour in 2012. to bring the Marathon Flame for first time to Antarctic Ice Marathon. He is founder of Quantum Nicosia Marathon in 2010. He is also a freefall skydiver and wingsuit pilot  trained in Russia, and a member of both the British Parachute Association and the U.S. Parachute Association.  He is an experienced pilot and in his free time enjoys flying with his power paraglider.

References

Literature 
Honorable speaker at the Graduation Ceremony
Biography from Vice-rector of University of Cyprus
Honorable speaker N. Ktorides
Athanasios Ktorides Foundation.
EuroAsia Interconnector

UNICEF Goodwill Ambassadors
Cypriot male marathon runners
Skydivers
1968 births
Greek Cypriot people
People from Nicosia

Living people
Cypriot businesspeople